Tove Bjørgaas (born 30 July 1972) is a Norwegian television correspondent.

She was born in Svolvær. She took the journalist education at Oslo University College and an economics degree at Johns Hopkins University. She was hired in the Norwegian Broadcasting Corporation (NRK) in 1996. Bjørgaas is best known for her two stints as NRK's correspondent in Washington, DC, from 2006 to 2010 and 2014 to 2018. She also issued a book on the Obama presidency, Forandring og frykt: Barack Obamas USA (2011). She resides in Asker.

References 

1972 births
Living people
People from Vågan
NRK people
Norwegian television reporters and correspondents
Norwegian expatriates in the United States